Bondoufle is a commune in the Essonne department in Île-de-France in northern France.  It is 27 km from Paris.

In 1994 the city hosted the Francophonie Games at the Stade Robert Bobin, which had been built for the occasion.

Population
Inhabitants of Bondoufle are known as Bondouflois.

Education
There are:
 Four preschools (école maternelle): Malraux, Mauriac, Mermoz, and Saint-Exupery
 Four elementary schools: Malraux, Mauriac, Mermoz, and Saint-Exupery
 Collège Charles Peguy (junior high school)
 Lycée François Truffaut (senior high school/sixth-form college)

See also
Communes of the Essonne department

References

External links
Official website 
Mayors of Essonne Association 
Land use (IAURIF) 

Communes of Essonne
Essonne communes articles needing translation from French Wikipedia